Therinia is a genus of moths in the family Saturniidae first described by Jacob Hübner in 1823.

Species
Therinia amphira Druce, 1890
Therinia buckleyi Druce, 1890
Therinia celata Jordan, 1924
Therinia diffissa Jordan, 1924
Therinia geometraria (Felder, 1862)
Therinia lactucina (Cramer, 1780)
Therinia paulina Jordan, 1924
Therinia podaliriaria (Westwood, 1841)
Therinia spinicauda Jordan, 1924
Therinia stricturaria (Hübner, 1825)
Therinia terminalis Jordan, 1924
Therinia transversaria Druce, 1887

References

Oxyteninae